Epidirella xanthophaes is a species of sea snail, a marine gastropod mollusk in the family Turridae, the turrids.

Description
The length of the shell varies between 18 mm and 28 mm.

(Original description by R.B. Watson) The shell is high, narrow, fusiform, subscalar, bicarinated, tubercled, fulvous, with brown specks between the carinal tubercles. 

Sculpture : Longitudinals — there are rough lines of growth. Spirals—the whole surface is covered with very unequal threads. Immediately below the suture is a broadish thread, puckered by the lines of growth. Below this on the shoulder of the shell there are three feeble threads rather widely and quite shallowly parted. The corner of the shoulder has a strongish rounded keel cut into white blunt tubercles, between which are chestnut spots. Below this keel is a broad and somewhat constricted furrow in which are some (3 to 6) feeble threads. The lower side of the furrow is formed by another keel also tubercled and speckled, but weaker than the upper keel. Between these two keels the shell is cylindrical. From this point it begins to contract, has one feeble thread, then plainly within the base two strongish threads, which are subtubercled. Below this on the front of the base and on the columella are about 10 threads. The
point of the columella has no threads, but is very rough. 

The colour of the shell is fulvous, with whitish and chestnut specks. The point of the snout is white. 

The spire is high, narrow, conical and slopingly scalar. Apex is coronated (?). It is somewhat rubbed, but seems to consist of 3 to 4 whorls. The shell consists of seven whorls, exclusive of those of the apex. They are bicarinated, constricted above and below, of slow aud regular increase. The body whorl is small, with a rounded elongated base and a small somewhat longish siphonal canal. The suture is strongly marked by the constriction above it, and is marginated by the puckered thread below. The aperture is club-shaped. The outer lip is thin, with a sinus strong rather than deep, V-shaped, extending from the suture, and having its apex at the keel. The inner lip is thin, concave above, then direct, and then at the siphonal canal strongly cut off to the left, and having a slight twist on its edge.

Biology
Members of the order Neogastropoda are mostly gonochoric and broadcast spawners. Life cycle: Embryos develop into planktonic trocophore larvae and later into juvenile veligers before becoming fully grown adults.

Life Cycle and Mating Behavior
Embryos develop into planktonic trocophore larvae and later into juvenile veligers before becoming fully grown adults.

Distribution
This marine species occurs off New South Wales and Tasmania, Australia, at depths between 37 m and 161 m.

References

 May, W.L. 1923. An illustrated index of Tasmanian shells: with 47 plates and 1052 species. Hobart : Government Printer 100 pp.
 Laseron, C. 1954. Revision of the New South Wales Turridae (Mollusca). Australian Zoological Handbook. Sydney : Royal Zoological Society of New South Wales pp. 56, pls 1–12. 
 Hedley, C. 1922. A revision of the Australian Turridae. Records of the Australian Museum 13(6): 213–359, pls 42–56 
 Wilson, B. 1994. Australian marine shells. Prosobranch gastropods. Kallaroo, WA : Odyssey Publishing Vol. 2 370 pp. 
 Powell, A. W. B. 1964. The family Turridae in the Indo-Pacific. Indo-Pacific Mollusca 1. (5): 227-346; 1 (7): 409-454
 Beechey, D. 2004. Epidirella xanthophaes (Watson, 1886). http://seashellsofnsw.org.au/Turridae/Pages/Epidirella_xanthophaes.htm

External links
 Des Beechey, The Seashells of New South Wales; January 2012
 May W.L. (1911). New marine Mollusca. Papers and Proceedings of the Royal Society of Tasmania. (1910): 380–398, pls 13–15
 Gastropods.com: Epidirella xanthophaes

xanthophaes
Gastropods described in 1886
Gastropods of Australia